Jordan Isaiah Brown (born December 4, 1999) is an American college basketball player for the Louisiana Ragin' Cajuns of the Sun Belt Conference (SBC). He previously played for the Nevada Wolf Pack and the Arizona Wildcats.

High school career
Brown attended Woodcreek High School for three years. As a freshman, he averaged 22.7 points, 10.5 rebounds and 3.0 blocks leading his team to a 27–6 record. As a sophomore, he averaged 26.7 points and 15.0 rebounds leading his team to a 20–9 record. As a junior, he averaged 26.3 points and 15.8 rebounds per game and was named a MaxPreps second-team All-American. He led the team to the state title game, where Woodcreek lost to Bishop Montgomery High School 74–67 despite 35 points and 17 rebounds from Brown. He was named the 2017 Sacramento Bee Player of the Year. Brown transferred to Prolific Prep his senior year of high school. He averaged 23.5 points and 13.1 rebounds per game at Prolific Prep while earning MaxPreps fourth-team All-American honors. Brown was named a McDonald's All-American and was the only McDonald's All American to commit to a university outside the Power 7.

Recruiting
Brown was a five-star recruit by 247Sports and Rivals and a four-star recruit by ESPN. Nevada was the first program to extend a scholarship offer to Brown, on April 13, 2015, after his freshman year. Nevada coach Eric Musselman first noticed Brown at an AAU event playing against his son. On May 11, 2018, he committed to play college basketball for Nevada over Arizona and California.

College career
With the addition of Brown and the return of twins Cody and Caleb Martin, Nevada was ranked in the top 10 of several preseason polls in the 2018–19 season. Brown was named Preseason MWC Freshman of the Year. At the end of the season, Brown entered the transfer portal.  On June 9, 2019, Brown announced that he would transfer to Arizona. Under NCAA rules, he was required to sit out the 2019–20 season, but became eligible to play in the 2020–21 season, with three years of eligibility left. Brown averaged 9.4 points and 5.2 rebounds per game, earning Pac-12 Sixth Man of the Year honors. After coach Sean Miller was fired, Brown opted to transfer to Louisiana. As a junior, Brown averaged 15.3 points, 8.6 rebounds, and 1.1 blocks per game. He was named to the Second Team All-Sun Belt.

National team career
Brown won a gold medal with the United States at the 2015 FIBA Americas Under-16 Championship in Bahía Blanca, Argentina. He played in all five games and averaged 9.4 points, 4.4 rebounds, and 2.0 assists per game. Brown won a gold medal with USA Basketball at the 2016 FIBA Under-17 World Championship where he averaged 5.9 points and 4.9 rebounds.

Career statistics

College

|-
| style="text-align:left;"| 2018–19
| style="text-align:left;"| Nevada
|| 33 || 1 || 10.1 || .506 || .000 || .625 || 2.1 || .5 || .3 || .5 || 3.0
|-
| style="text-align:left;"| 2019–20
| style="text-align:left;"| Arizona
| style="text-align:center;" colspan="11"|  Redshirt
|-
| style="text-align:left;"| 2020–21
| style="text-align:left;"| Arizona
|| 26 || 11 || 19.6 || .560 || .000 || .598 || 5.2 || .6 || .5 || .9 || 9.4
|-
| style="text-align:left;"| 2021–22
| style="text-align:left;"| Louisiana
|| 27 || 24 || 28.8 || .516 || .444 || .619 || 8.6 || 1.1 || .8 || 1.1 || 15.3
|- class="sortbottom"
| style="text-align:center;" colspan="2"| Career
| 86 || 36 || 18.8 || .528 || .414 || .612 || 5.1 || .7 || .5 || .8 || 8.8

References

External links
Louisiana Ragin' Cajuns bio
Arizona Wildcats bio
Nevada Wolf Pack bio
USA Basketball bio

1999 births
Living people
American men's basketball players
Basketball players from California
McDonald's High School All-Americans
Arizona Wildcats men's basketball players
Nevada Wolf Pack men's basketball players
Louisiana Ragin' Cajuns men's basketball players
Sportspeople from Roseville, California
Sportspeople from Vallejo, California
Centers (basketball)
Power forwards (basketball)